These Are the Moments is the seventh studio album by Canadian folk music group The Rankin Family. It was released by MapleMusic Recordings on February 3, 2009. The album peaked at number 29 on the Canadian Albums Chart.

Track listing

External links
[ These Are the Moments] at Allmusic

2009 albums
The Rankin Family albums